The 2016 Fitzgerald Glider Kits 300 was the seventh stock car race of the 2016 NASCAR Xfinity Series season and the 34th iteration of the event. The race was held on Saturday, April 16, 2016, in Bristol, Tennessee at Bristol Motor Speedway, a 0.533 miles (0.858 km) permanent oval-shaped racetrack. The race took the scheduled 200 laps to complete, with the first 100 laps being split into two 50-lap heats of 20 cars. At race's end, Erik Jones, driving for Joe Gibbs Racing, would complete a late race charge on the final restart with three to go to win his third career NASCAR Xfinity Series win and his first of the season. To fill out the podium, Kyle Busch, driving for Joe Gibbs Racing, and Kyle Larson, driving for Chip Ganassi Racing, would finish second and third, respectively.

Background 

The Bristol Motor Speedway, formerly known as Bristol International Raceway and Bristol Raceway, is a NASCAR short track venue located in Bristol, Tennessee. Constructed in 1960, it held its first NASCAR race on July 30, 1961. Despite its short length, Bristol is among the most popular tracks on the NASCAR schedule because of its distinct features, which include extraordinarily steep banking, an all concrete surface, two pit roads, and stadium-like seating. It has also been named one of the loudest NASCAR tracks.

Dash 4 Cash format and eligibility 
In 2016, NASCAR would announce changes to its Dash 4 Cash format. The format would now include heat races to determine qualifiers. Each driver would qualify for heats in knockout qualifying, with odd-position drivers driving in heat #1, and even-position drivers competing in heat #2. The top two finishers of each heat would compete for the Dash 4 Cash in the main race after the heats.

Entry list 

 (R) denotes rookie driver.
 (i) denotes driver who is ineligible for series driver points.

Practice

First practice 
The first practice session was held on Friday, April 15, at 12:30 PM EST. The session would last for one hour and 25 minutes.

Second and final practice 
The final practice session, sometimes known as Happy Hour, was held on Friday, April 15, at 3:00 PM EST. The session would last for 55 minutes.

Heat qualifying 
Qualifying for the two preliminary heat races was held on Saturday, April 16, at 9:30 AM EST. Since Bristol Motor Speedway is under 2 miles (3.2 km) in length, the qualifying system was a multi-car system that included three rounds. The first round was 15 minutes, where every driver would be able to set a lap within the 15 minutes. Then, the second round would consist of the fastest 24 cars in Round 1, and drivers would have 10 minutes to set a lap. Round 3 consisted of the fastest 12 drivers from Round 2, and the drivers would have 5 minutes to set a time. Whoever was fastest in Round 3 would win the pole. 

Two drivers would fail to qualify: Morgan Shepherd and Carl Long.

Full qualifying results

Heat #1 results 
Heat #1 was held on Saturday, April 16, at 12:30 PM EST. The race took 50 laps to complete. Erik Jones, driving for Joe Gibbs Racing, would dominate the race to win the heat and the overall pole. Kyle Larson would complete the two drivers in the heat eligible for the Dash 4 Cash.

Heat #2 results 
Heat #2 was held on Saturday, April 16, at approximately 1:10 PM EST. The race took 50 laps to complete. Austin Dillon, driving for Richard Childress Racing, would dominate the race to win the outside pole. Ty Dillon would complete the two drivers in the heat eligible for the Dash 4 Cash.

Main race lineup

Main race results

Standings after the race 

Drivers' Championship standings

Note: Only the first 12 positions are included for the driver standings.

References 

2016 NASCAR Xfinity Series
NASCAR races at Bristol Motor Speedway
April 2016 sports events in the United States
2016 in sports in Tennessee